Jiří Havlis (16 November 1932 – 31 January 2010) was a Czech rower who competed for Czechoslovakia in the 1952 Summer Olympics.

He was born in Majdalena, Jindřichův Hradec District. In 1952 he was a crew member of the Czechoslovak boat which won the gold medal in the coxed four event.

External links
 Jiří Havlis' profile at Sports Reference.com
 Jiří Havlis' obituary 

1932 births
2010 deaths
Czech male rowers
Czechoslovak male rowers
Olympic rowers of Czechoslovakia
Rowers at the 1952 Summer Olympics
Olympic gold medalists for Czechoslovakia
Olympic medalists in rowing
Medalists at the 1952 Summer Olympics
People from Jindřichův Hradec District
European Rowing Championships medalists
Sportspeople from the South Bohemian Region